The King on Main Street, also known as The King, is a 1925 American silent romantic comedy film directed by Monta Bell and starring Adolphe Menjou and Bessie Love. The film was adapted for the screen by Bell, and was based on the play The King, Leo Ditrichstein's adaptation of the  1908 French play Le Roi by Gaston Arman de Caillavet, Robert de Flers, and Emmanuel Arène. It was produced by Famous Players-Lasky and distributed by Paramount Pictures.

The King on Main Street includes two sequences filmed in early two-strip Technicolor. These sequences, along with a print of the film, still exist. The film is in the public domain and is available on the Internet Archive.

Plot 

King Serge IV of Molvania (Menjou) comes to Manhattan to conduct business with Arthur Trent (Kilgour), but instead goes to Coney Island, where he meets Gladys Humphreys (Love) and John Rockland (Shaw). John, not knowing the king's royal identity, invites him to his home at Little Falls, New Jersey. The king falls in love with Gladys, but Trent catches them in a compromising situation, and blackmails the king into completing their business deal. The king leaves the United States and Gladys forever.

Cast

Production 
The film was partially filmed on location in New York, New Jersey, and Coney Island.

Bessie Love's performance of the Charleston in this film popularized the dance within the United States.

Reception
The film did well at the box office, particularly in small town America.

See also
 List of early color feature films

References

External links

Databases

Video

Imagery
 Lobby card
 Poster

1925 romantic comedy films
1920s color films
1925 films
American black-and-white films
American films based on plays
American romantic comedy films
American silent feature films
Famous Players-Lasky films
Films directed by Monta Bell
Films set in New York City
Paramount Pictures films
Silent films in color
Surviving American silent films
1920s American films
Silent romantic comedy films
Silent American comedy films